The Unlikely Lad is the debut album from English singer Tyler James. It was released on 29 August 2005 as a digital download only and subsequently failed to chart. The album spawned three singles: "Why Do I Do?", "Foolish" and "Your Woman". Following James' participation in the first series of The Voice UK, the album was released on CD for the first time on 2 July 2012.

Singles
 "Why Do I Do?" was released as the lead single on November 1, 2004. The single peaked at number 25 on the UK Singles Chart.
 "Foolish" was released as the second single on March 7, 2005. It peaked at number 16 on the same chart.
 "Your Woman" was released as the third single on August 22, 2005. It peaked at number 60.

Track listing

Release history

References

2005 debut albums
Tyler James (English musician) albums
Island Records albums